The 1935 New York Giants season was the franchise's 53rd season. The team finished in third place in the National League with a 91–62 record, 8½ games behind the Chicago Cubs.

Offseason
 November 1, 1934: Johnny Vergez, Pretzel Pezzullo, Blondy Ryan, George Watkins and cash were traded by the Giants to the Philadelphia Phillies for Dick Bartell.
 December 12, 1934: Jack Salveson was traded by the Giants to the Pittsburgh Pirates for Leon Chagnon.

Regular season

Season standings

Record vs. opponents

Notable transactions 
 June 22, 1935: Jimmy Ripple was purchased by the Giants from the Montreal Royals.

Roster

Player stats

Batting

Starters by position 
Note: Pos = Position; G = Games played; AB = At bats; H = Hits; Avg. = Batting average; HR = Home runs; RBI = Runs batted in

Other batters 
Note: G = Games played; AB = At bats; H = Hits; Avg. = Batting average; HR = Home runs; RBI = Runs batted in

Pitching

Starting pitchers 
Note: G = Games pitched; IP = Innings pitched; W = Wins; L = Losses; ERA = Earned run average; SO = Strikeouts

Other pitchers 
Note: G = Games pitched; IP = Innings pitched; W = Wins; L = Losses; ERA = Earned run average; SO = Strikeouts

Relief pitchers 
Note: G = Games pitched; W = Wins; L = Losses; SV = Saves; ERA = Earned run average; SO = Strikeouts

Farm system 

LEAGUE CHAMPIONS: Tallahassee

Notes

References 
1935 New York Giants season at Baseball Reference

New York Giants (NL)
San Francisco Giants seasons
New York Giants season
New York
1930s in Manhattan
Washington Heights, Manhattan